The House of Castro is an Iberian noble lineage present in the since the Middle Ages in the kingdoms of Castile, Galicia, and Portugal. Though its exact origins are disputed, the House of Castro became one of the most powerful families of the Spanish and Portuguese nobility.

History
The first clearly identified member of the family was early-12th century count Fernando García de Hita, a kinsman and vassal of Urraca of León and Castile. This kinship, along with his patronymic, have led to him being considered illegitimate son of Urraca's uncle García II of Galicia. More recently, it has been suggested that he was the son of count García Ordóñez by the infanta Urraca Garcés of Navarre, and perhaps scion of the Banu Gómez clan.

During the reign of Alfonso VIII, the Castro family, under Gutierrez Fernandez, rivaled another major Castilian family, the House of Lara, for power in the kingdom of Castile.

The lack of heirs in the senior line resulted in the rise of a cadet branch seated in Galicia. This branch became the most powerful of the Galician nobility, and one of the most powerful in Spain. Traditionally linked to the county of Lemos, the most illustrious representatives were the "Great Count of Lemos" and his uncle, Cardinal Rodrigo de Castro Osorio. Another scion, Pedro Antonio Fernández de Castro is still well remembered in Peru.

The House of Castro became one of the most powerful families of the Spanish and Portuguese nobility. The House of Castro went into decline because of their lack of offspring, with the county of Lemos passing to the House of Alba. The coat of the Galician branch of the House of Castro were six blue roundels on a silver field. The Portuguese branch used a variant that included thirteen roundels on gold.

Notes

References
 Libro becerro de las behetrías. Estudio y texto crítico por Gonzalo Martínez Díez, León: Centro de Estudios e Investigación San Isidoro, 1981. 3 volúmenes. Colección Fuentes y Estudios de Historia Leonesa, nº 24–26. . Signatura de la Biblioteca del CIDA: nº 1998. Estudio y Texto crítico
 Martinez García, Mónica Pedro Fernández de Castro, O Gran Conde de Lemos, Santiago de Compostela, 2005..
Salazar Acha, Jaime de. "El linaje castellano de Castro en el siglo XII: consideraciones e hipótesis sobre su origin." Anales de la Real Academia Matritense de Heráldica y Genealogía, 1:33–68 (1991).
 Vázquez, Germán Historia de Monforte y su Tierra de Lemos, .

 
Portuguese noble families
Spanish noble families